"Wonderful Night" is a song by English big beat musician Fatboy Slim, released as a single from his album Palookaville. It features vocalist Lateef the Truthspeaker, credited monomously as Lateef on the single release. The song is often played at Staples Center immediately after Los Angeles Clippers home wins and at Madison Square Garden during the second half of New York Knicks games. A shortened version of the song also appears on the video game Dance Dance Revolution Extreme 2. The song was edited for radio due to the brief coarse language used in the middle of the song.

Critical reception
The song garnered mostly positive reviews from music critics. David Jeffries of Allmusic felt the song was one of the highlights of the album. Pitchfork's Johnny Loftus called the song's rhythm "concise," also praising Lateef's performance. Rolling Stone's review of "Palookaville" called the song "groovy."

Music video
A music video for the song was released; it features tuxedo-clad dancers in and around an old-fashioned casino following a singer that turns into a werewolf.

Use in media
The song is featured in Robots and Flushed Away

The song was mashed with Here Comes Santa Claus in a J. C. Penney Christmas commercial in 2006.

Track listing

Charts

References

Songs about nights
2004 singles
Fatboy Slim songs
Songs written by Norman Cook
2004 songs
Astralwerks singles
Skint Records singles